The "Song of Happiness" or "Warm Welcome Music" (Korean: 따뜻한 환영의 음악) is the entrance music of the leaders of North Korea. It has been played for all three of the past leaders, Kim Il-sung, Kim Jong-il and Kim Jong-un, whenever they enter or leave a public event. Generally during their entrance, the crowd chants cheers of manse (Korean:만세), similar to the Japanese banzai salute.

When appearing at musical performances, separate brass bands of the Korean People's Army performed the piece during the time of Kim Jong-il and early-Kim Jong-un. Nowadays however, the entrance music is generally played by the ensemble performing, with all of the musicians looking directly at the leader whilst standing. The piece has also been used to welcome dignitaries to Pyongyang for significant occasions, such as Moon Jae-in for the September 2018 inter-Korean summit, and Xi Jinping for the North Korea-China summit in 2019.

Lyrics 
During the leadership of Kim Il-sung, the song was noted to have lyrics chanting "Long Live Comrade Kim Il-sung", however this was dropped after his death in 1994.

References

External links

 30 seconds of the "Song of Happiness for the Great Leader" during state arrival ceremonies in Pyongyang
 Song of Happiness for the Great Leader

Asian anthems
State ritual and ceremonies
North Korean propaganda songs
Songs about Kim Il-sung